The atypical antipsychotics (AAP), also known as second generation antipsychotics (SGAs) and serotonin–dopamine antagonists (SDAs), are a group of antipsychotic drugs (antipsychotic drugs in general are also known as tranquilizers and neuroleptics, although the latter is usually reserved for the typical antipsychotics) largely introduced after the 1970s and used to treat psychiatric conditions. Some atypical antipsychotics have received regulatory approval (e.g. by the FDA of the US, the TGA of Australia, the MHRA of the UK) for schizophrenia, bipolar disorder, irritability in autism, and as an adjunct in major depressive disorder.

Both generations of medication tend to block receptors in the brain's dopamine pathways. Atypicals are less likely than haloperidol—the most widely used typical antipsychotic—to cause extrapyramidal motor control disabilities in patients such as unsteady Parkinson's disease-type movements, body rigidity, and involuntary tremors. However, only a few of the atypicals have been demonstrated to be superior to lesser-used, low-potency first-generation antipsychotics in this regard.

As experience with these agents has grown, several studies have questioned the utility of broadly characterizing antipsychotic drugs as "atypical/second generation" as opposed to "first generation", noting that each agent has its own efficacy and side-effect profile. It has been argued that a more nuanced view in which the needs of individual patients are matched to the properties of individual drugs is more appropriate. Although atypical antipsychotics are thought to be safer than typical antipsychotics, they still have severe side effects, including tardive dyskinesia (a serious movement disorder), neuroleptic malignant syndrome, and increased risk of stroke, sudden cardiac death, blood clots, and diabetes. Significant weight gain may occur. Critics have argued that "the time has come to abandon the terms first-generation and second-generation antipsychotics, as they do not merit this distinction."

Medical uses
Atypical antipsychotics are typically used to treat schizophrenia or bipolar disorder. They are also frequently used to treat agitation associated with dementia, anxiety disorder, autism spectrum disorder, and obsessive-compulsive disorder (an off-label use). In dementia, they should only be considered after other treatments have failed and if the patient is a risk to themselves and/or others.

Schizophrenia
The first-line psychiatric treatment for schizophrenia is antipsychotic medication, which can reduce the positive symptoms of schizophrenia in about 8–15 days. Antipsychotics only appear to improve secondary negative symptoms of schizophrenia in the short term and may worsen negative symptoms overall. Overall there is no good evidence that atypical antipsychotics have any therapeutic benefit for treating the negative symptoms of schizophrenia.

There is very little evidence on which to base a risk and benefit assessment of using antipsychotics for long-term treatment.

The choice of which antipsychotic to use for a specific patient is based on benefits, risks, and costs. It is debatable whether, as a class, typical or atypical antipsychotics are better. Both have equal drop-out and symptom relapse rates when typicals are used at low to moderate dosages. There is a good response in 40–50% of patients, a partial response in 30–40%, and treatment resistance (failure of symptoms to respond satisfactorily after six weeks to two of three different antipsychotics) in the remaining 20%. Clozapine is considered a first choice treatment for treatment resistant schizophrenia, especially in the short term; in the longer-terms the risks of adverse effects complicate the choice. In turn, risperidone, olanzapine, and aripiprazole have been recommended for the treatment of first-episode psychosis.

Efficacy in the treatment of schizophrenia
The utility of broadly grouping the antipsychotics into first generation and atypical categories has been challenged. It has been argued that a more nuanced view, matching the properties of individual drugs to the needs of specific patients is preferable. While the atypical (second-generation) antipsychotics were marketed as offering greater efficacy in reducing psychotic symptoms while reducing side effects (and extrapyramidal symptoms in particular) than typical medications, the results showing these effects often lacked robustness, and the assumption was increasingly challenged even as atypical prescriptions were soaring. In 2005 the US government body NIMH published the results of a major independent (not funded by the pharmaceutical companies) multi-site, double-blind study (the CATIE project). This study compared several atypical antipsychotics to an older, mid-potency typical antipsychotic, perphenazine, among 1,493 persons with schizophrenia. The study found that only olanzapine outperformed perphenazine in discontinuation rate (the rate at which people stopped taking it due to its effects). The authors noted an apparent superior efficacy of olanzapine to the other drugs in terms of reduction in psychopathology and rate of hospitalizations, but olanzapine was associated with relatively severe metabolic effects such as a major weight gain problem (averaging 9.4 lbs over 18 months) and increases in glucose, cholesterol, and triglycerides. No other atypical studied (risperidone, quetiapine, and ziprasidone) did better than the typical perphenazine on the measures used, nor did they produce fewer adverse effects than the typical antipsychotic perphenazine (a result supported by a meta-analysis by Leucht et al. published in The Lancet), although more patients discontinued perphenazine owing to extrapyramidal effects compared to the atypical agents (8% vs. 2% to 4%, P=0.002). A phase 2 part of this CATIE study roughly replicated these findings. Compliance has not been shown to be different between the two types. Overall evaluations of the CATIE and other studies have led many researchers to question the first-line prescribing of atypicals over typicals, or even to question the distinction between the two classes.

It has been suggested that there is no validity to the term "second-generation antipsychotic drugs" and that the drugs that currently occupy this category are not identical to each other in mechanism, efficacy, and side-effect profiles.

Each drug has its own mechanism, as RDr. if S. El-Mallakh, explained regarding the binding site and occupancy with a focus on the dopamine D2 receptor:In general, when an antagonist of a neurotransmitter receptor is used, it must occupy a minimum of 65% to 70% of the target receptor to be effective. This is clearly the case when the target is a postsynaptic receptor, such as the dopamine D2 receptor. Similarly, despite significant variability in antidepressant response, blockade of 65% to 80% of presynaptic transport proteins—such as the serotonin reuptake pumps when considering serotoninergic antidepressants, or the norepinephrine reuptake pumps when considering noradrenergic agents such as nortriptyline—is necessary for these medications to be effective.... Depending on the level of intrinsic activity of a partial agonist and clinical goal, the clinician may aim for a different level of receptor occupancy. For example, aripiprazole will act as a dopamine agonist at lower concentrations, but blocks the receptor at higher concentrations. Unlike antagonist antipsychotics, which require only 65% to 70% D2 receptor occupancy to be effective, aripiprazole receptor binding at effective antipsychotic doses is 90% to 95%. Since aripiprazole has an intrinsic activity of approximately 30% (i.e, when it binds, it stimulates the D2 receptor to about 30% of the effect of dopamine binding to the receptor), binding to 90% of the receptors, and displacing endogenous dopamine, allows aripiprazole to replace the background or tonic tone of dopamine, which has been measured at 19% in people with schizophrenia and 9% in controls. Clinically, this still appears as the minimal effective dose achieving maximal response without significant parkinsonism despite >90% receptor occupancy.

Bipolar disorder
In bipolar disorder, SGAs are most commonly used to rapidly control acute mania and mixed episodes, often in conjunction with mood stabilizers (which tend to have a delayed onset of action in such cases) such as lithium and valproate. In milder cases of mania or mixed episodes, mood stabilizer monotherapy may be attempted first. SGAs are also used to treat other aspects of the disorder (such as acute bipolar depression or as a prophylactic treatment) as adjuncts or as a monotherapy, depending on the drug. Both quetiapine and olanzapine have demonstrated significant efficacy in all three treatment phases of bipolar disorder. Lurasidone (trade name Latuda) has demonstrated some efficacy in the acute depressive phase of bipolar disorder.

Major depressive disorder
In non-psychotic major depressive disorder (MDD), some SGAs have demonstrated significant efficacy as adjunctive agents; and, such agents include:

 Aripiprazole
Brexpiprazole
 Olanzapine
 Quetiapine
 Ziprasidone

whereas only quetiapine has demonstrated efficacy as a monotherapy in non-psychotic MDD. Olanzapine/fluoxetine is an efficacious treatment in both psychotic and non-psychotic MDD.

Aripiprazole, brexpiprazole, olanzapine, and quetiapine have been approved as adjunct treatment for MDD by the FDA in the United States. Quetiapine, lurasidone, and lumateperone have been approved, as monotherapies, for bipolar depression, but as of present, lurasidone has not been approved for MDD.

Autism
Both risperidone and aripiprazole have received FDA approval for irritability in autism.

Dementia and Alzheimer's disease
Between May 2007 and April 2008, Dementia and Alzheimer's together accounted for 28% of atypical antipsychotic use in patients aged 65 or older. The U.S. Food and Drug Administration requires that all atypical antipsychotics carry a black box warning that the medication has been associated with an increased risk of mortality in elderly patients. In 2005, the FDA issued an advisory warning of an increased risk of death when atypical antipsychotics are used in dementia. In the subsequent 5 years, the use of atypical antipsychotics to treat dementia decreased by nearly 50%.

Use as antidots for drug exposure
Antipsychotics often provide a more than suspicious receptor profile (for example with Lsd and its direct opposite action at d2 dopamine recpectors and 5ht receptors in general) for opposite reactons to its targets or they are in use because of its lacking features like none respiratory depression in order to manage, for example, a delir.

Comparison table of efficacy

Adverse effects 
The side effects reportedly associated with the various atypical antipsychotics vary and are medication-specific. Generally speaking, atypical antipsychotics are widely believed to have a lower likelihood for the development of tardive dyskinesia than the typical antipsychotics. However, tardive dyskinesia typically develops after long-term (possibly decades) use of antipsychotics. It is not clear if atypical antipsychotics, having been in use for a relatively short time, produce a lower incidence of tardive dyskinesia.

Among the other side effects that have been suggested is that atypical antipsychotics increase the risk of cardiovascular disease. Kabinoff et al. found that the increase in cardiovascular disease is seen regardless of the treatment received, and that it is instead caused by many different factors such as lifestyle or diet.

Sexual side effects have also been reported when taking atypical antipsychotics. In males antipsychotics reduce sexual interest, impair sexual performance with the main difficulties being failure to ejaculate. In females there may be abnormal menstrual cycles and infertility. In both males and females the breasts may become enlarged and a fluid will sometimes ooze from the nipples. Sexual adverse effects caused by some antipsychotics are a result of an increase of prolactin. Sulpiride and Amisulpiride, as well as Risperdone and paliperidone (to a lesser extent), cause a high increase of prolactin.

In April 2005, the US Food and Drug Administration (FDA) issued an advisory and subsequent black box warning regarding the risks of atypical antipsychotic use among elderly patients with dementia. The FDA advisory was associated with decreases in the use of atypical antipsychotics, especially among elderly patients with dementia. Subsequent research reports confirmed the mortality risks associated with the use of both conventional and atypical antipsychotics to treat patients with dementia. Consequently, in 2008 the FDA issued although a black box warning for classical neuroleptics. Data on treatment efficacies are strongest for atypical antipsychotics. Adverse effects in patients with dementia include an increased risk of mortality and cerebrovascular events, as well as metabolic effects, extrapyramidal symptoms, falls, cognitive worsening, cardiac arrhythmia, and pneumonia. Conventional antipsychotics may pose an even greater safety risk. No clear efficacy evidence exists to support the use of alternative psychotropic classes (e.g. antidepressants, anticonvulsants).

Atypical antipsychotics may also cause anhedonia.

Drug-induced OCD 

Many different types of medication can induce in patients that have never had symptoms before. A new chapter about OCD in the DSM-5 (2013) now specifically includes drug-induced OCD.

There are reports that some atypical antipsychotics could cause drug-induced OCD in already schizophrenic patients.

Tardive dyskinesia 
All of the atypical antipsychotics warn about the possibility of tardive dyskinesia in their package inserts and in the PDR. It is not possible to truly know the risks of tardive dyskinesia when taking atypicals, because tardive dyskinesia can take many decades to develop and the atypical antipsychotics are not old enough to have been tested over a long enough period of time to determine all of the long-term risks. One hypothesis as to why atypicals have a lower risk of tardive dyskinesia is because they are much less fat-soluble than the typical antipsychotics and because they are readily released from D2 receptor and brain tissue. The typical antipsychotics remain attached to the D2 receptors and accumulate in the brain tissue which may lead to TD.

Both typical and atypical antipsychotics can cause tardive dyskinesia. According to one study, rates are lower with the atypicals at 3.9% per year as opposed to the typicals at 5.5% per year.

Metabolism 
Recently, metabolic concerns have been of grave concern to clinicians, patients and the FDA. In 2003, the Food and Drug Administration (FDA) required all manufacturers of atypical antipsychotics to change their labeling to include a warning about the risks of hyperglycemia and diabetes with atypical antipsychotics. It must also be pointed out that although all atypicals must carry the warning on their labeling, some evidence shows that atypicals are not equal in their effects on weight and insulin sensitivity. The general consensus is that clozapine and olanzapine are associated with the greatest effects on weight gain and decreased insulin sensitivity, followed by risperidone and quetiapine. Ziprasidone and aripiprazole are thought to have the smallest effects on weight and insulin resistance, but clinical experience with these newer agents is not as developed as that with the older agents. The mechanism of these adverse effects is not completely understood but it is believed to result from a complex interaction between a number of pharmacologic actions of these drugs. Their effects on weight are believed to mostly derive from their actions on the H1 and 5-HT2C receptors, while their effects on insulin sensitivity are believed to be the result of a combination of their effects on body weight (as increased body mass is known to be a risk factor for insulin resistance) and their antagonistic effects on the M3 receptor. Some of the newer agents, however, such as risperidone and its metabolite paliperidone, ziprasidone, lurasidone, aripiprazole, asenapine and iloperidone, have clinically insignificant effects on the M3 receptor and appear to carry a lower risk of insulin resistance. Whereas clozapine, olanzapine and quetiapine (indirectly via its active metabolite, norquetiapine) all antagonise the M3 receptor at therapeutic-relevant concentrations.

Recent evidence suggests a role of the α1 adrenoceptor and 5-HT2A receptor in the metabolic effects of atypical antipsychotics. The 5-HT2A receptor, however, is also believed to play a crucial role in the therapeutic advantages of atypical antipsychotics over their predecessors, the typical antipsychotics.

The two atypical antipsychotics with trials showing that had a low incidence of weight gain in large meta-analysis were lurasidone and aripiprazole. In a meta-analysis of 18 antipsychotics, olanzapine and clozapine exhibited the worst metabolic parameters and aripiprazole, brexpiprazole, cariprazine, lurasidone, and ziprasidone the most benign parameters.

A study by Sernyak and colleagues found that the prevalence of diabetes in atypical antipsychotic treatments was statistically significantly higher than that of conventional treatment. The authors of this study suggest that it is a causal relationship the Kabinoff et al. suggest the findings only suggest a temporal association. Kabinoff et al. suggest that there is insufficient data from large studies to demonstrate a consistent or significant difference in the risk of insulin resistance during treatment with various atypical antipsychotics.

Comparison table of adverse effects

Discontinuation
The British National Formulary recommends a gradual withdrawal when discontinuing antipsychotics to avoid acute withdrawal syndrome or rapid relapse. Symptoms of withdrawal commonly include nausea, vomiting, and loss of appetite. Other symptoms may include restlessness, increased sweating, and trouble sleeping. Less commonly there may be a feeling of the world spinning, numbness, or muscle pains. Symptoms generally resolve after a short period of time.

There is tentative evidence that discontinuation of antipsychotics can result in psychosis. It may also result in reoccurrence of the condition that is being treated. Rarely tardive dyskinesia can occur when the medication is stopped.

Pharmacology

Pharmacodynamics 
The atypical antipsychotics integrate with the serotonin (5-HT), norepinephrine (α, β), and dopamine (DA) receptors in order to effectively treat schizophrenia.

D2 Receptor: Hyperactive dopaminergic activity on D2 receptors in the mesolimbic pathway is responsible for the positive symptoms of schizophrenia (hallucinations, delusions, paranoia). After taking an antipsychotic, antagonism of D2 receptors occurs throughout the entire brain, leading to a number of deleterious side effects from D2 receptor antagonism throughout the entire dopamine pathway system. It's not possible to affect D2 receptors only in the mesolimbic pathway, but 5-HT2A receptor antagonism reverses these side effects to some extent. Reducing D2 dopaminergic activity in the mesolimbic pathway also results in an anhedonic effect, reducing pleasure and motivation. In the mesocortical pathway to the DLPFC and VMPFC, endogenous D2 receptor dopamine activity is sometimes low in schizophrenia, resulting in cognitive, affective, and, broadly, the negative symptoms of schizophrenia. D2 receptor antagonism further compounds these problems. In the nigrostriatal pathway, D2 receptor antagonism results in extrapyramidal symptoms. If this antagonism occurs long enough, symptoms of EPS may become permanent, even if antipsychotic use is discontinued. In the tuberoinfundibular pathway, D2 receptor antagonism results in elevated prolactin. If prolactin levels become high enough, hyperprolactinaemia may occur, resulting in sexual dysfunction, weight gain, more rapid demineralization of bones, and possibly galactorrhea and amenorrhea.

5-HT2A Receptor: When serotonin is released on to postsynaptic 5-HT2A receptors, the dopamine neuron is inhibited, thus acting as a brake on dopamine release. This brake is disrupted through action of a 5-HT2A antagonist, which disinhibits the dopamine neuron, stimulating dopamine release. The result of this is that dopamine competes with antipsychotic D2 antagonistic action at D2 receptors, thereby reducing antagonistic binding there and eliminating or lowering D2 antagonistic effects in several pathways of the dopamine system. In the nigrostratial pathway, it reduces EPS. In the tuberoinfundibular pathway, it reduces or eliminates prolactin elevation. Dopamine release in the mesolimbic pathway from 5-HT2A antagonism does not appear to be as robust as in the other pathways of the dopamine system, thereby accounting for why atypical antipsychotics still retain part of their efficacy against the positive symptoms of schizophrenia through their D2 antagonism. When 5-HT2A antagonistic agent particles occupy 5-HT2A receptors in the mesocortical pathway and in the prefrontal cortex, the negative symptoms of schizophrenia, affective symptoms, and cognitive deficits and abnormalities are treated and reduced. Furthermore, 5-HT2A receptor antagonism blocks the serotonergic excitation of cortical pyramidal cells, reducing glutamate release, which in turn lowers hyperactive dopaminergic D2 receptor activity in the mesolimbic pathway, reducing or eliminating the positive symptoms of schizophrenia.

Brexpiprazole, approved by the US FDA in 2015, has a similar binding profile to aripiprazole as a partial D2 agonist with moderate histamine binding, but with brexipiprazole has a higher affinity for serotonin receptor 5-HT2A 

Some effects of 5-HT1A receptor activation include decreased aggressive behavior/ideation, increased sociability, and decreased anxiety and depression. Blockade of the 5-HT2C receptor increases serotonin, releasing norepinephrine and dopamine within the brain. But neuronal reuptake of norepinephrine is limited sharply by some antipsychotics, e.g. ziprasidone. Increased norepinephrine can cause increased glucose(blood sugar) levels. Increased blood sugar levels by increased norepinephrine causes hunger in many humans, which is why weight gain occurs with some antipsychotics if the norepinephrine is not inhibited. Inhibition of norepinephrine stabilizes mood in humans. 5-HT6 receptor antagonists improve cognition, learning, and memory. The 5-HT7 receptor is very potent for the mitigation of bipolar conditions and also yields an antidepressant effect. The antipsychotics asenapine, lurasidone, risperidone, and aripiprazole are very potent at the 5-HT7 receptor. Antagonistic affinity for the H1 receptor also has an antidepressant effect. H1 antagonism blocks serotonin and norepinephrine reuptake. Patients with increased histamine levels have been observed to have lower serotonin levels. However, the H1 receptor is linked to weight gain. To have partial agonism at the 5-HT1A receptor can yield absence of weight gain in an antipsychotic. This is very relevant for ziprasidone, but it creates a risk for a prolonged QTc interval. On the other hand, blockade of the 5-HT3 receptor removes the risk for a prolonged QTc interval, but then creates a larger risk for weight gain. Relation to the 5-HT3 receptor increases caloric uptake and glucose, which is seen in clozapine and olanzapine. Other ways for dopamine to resolve is to have agonism at both the D2 receptor and 5-HT1A receptor, which normalizes the dopamine level in the brain. This occurs with cariprazine and aripiprazole.

Whether the anhedonic, loss of pleasure and motivation effect resulting from dopamine insufficiency or blockade at D2 receptors in the mesolimbic pathway, which is mediated in some part by antipsychotics (and despite dopamine release in the mesocortical pathway from 5-HT2A antagonism, which is seen in atypical antipsychotics), or the positive mood, mood stabilization, and cognitive improvement effect resulting from atypical antipsychotic serotonergic activity is greater for the overall quality of life effect of an atypical antipsychotic is a question that is variable between individual experience and the atypical antipsychotic(s) being used.

The term "atypical" for antipsychotics often related to their ability possessing a more friendly epms-side effect profile is usefull as a quick description to name the most basic difference between typicals and atypicals. And in general this seems fitting for most of the substances compared to each other, but it isn't a rigorous rule fitting for all substances rather it has some exceptions like risperidone triggering parkinsonian symptomps allready slightly above its clinical dose in some cases, aripiprazole and other third generation atypicals though having partial agonism and a reduced parkinsonian risk having a high possibility for akathasia, which is sometimes more quality of life threatening then epms, through its extreme occupancy of d2 receptors and many low-potency typical antipsychotics (used often for calming patients, not as maintenance therapy) having some strong compensatory 5ht2a and anticholinergic binding usually referred to atypicals.

Terms

Inhibition. Disinhibition: The opposite process of inhibition, the turning on of a biological function. Release: Causes the appropriate neurotransmitters to be discharged in vesicles into the synapse where they attempt to bind to and activate a receptor. Downregulation and Upregulation.

Binding profile
Note: Unless otherwise specified, the drugs below serve as antagonists/inverse agonists at the receptors listed.

Legend:

Pharmacokinetics
Atypical antipsychotics are most commonly administered orally. Antipsychotics can also be injected, but this method is not as common. They are lipid-soluble, are readily absorbed from the digestive tract, and can easily pass the blood–brain barrier and placental barriers. Once in the brain, the antipsychotics work at the synapse by binding to the receptor. Antipsychotics are completely metabolized in the body and the metabolites are excreted in urine. These drugs have relatively long half-lives. Each drug has a different half-life, but the occupancy of the D2 receptor falls off within 24 hours with atypical antipsychotics, while lasting over 24 hours for the typical antipsychotics. This may explain why relapse into psychosis happens quicker with atypical antipsychotics than with typical antipsychotics, as the drug is excreted faster and is no longer working in the brain. Physical dependence with these drugs is very rare. However, if the drug is abruptly discontinued, psychotic symptoms, movement disorders, and sleep difficulty may be observed. It is possible that withdrawal is rarely seen because the AAP are stored in body fat tissues and slowly released.

History 
The first major tranquilizer or antipsychotic medication, chlorpromazine (Thorazine), a typical antipsychotic, was discovered in 1951 and introduced into clinical practice shortly thereafter. Clozapine (Clozaril), an atypical antipsychotic, fell out of favor due to concerns over drug-induced agranulocytosis. Following research indicating its effectiveness in treatment-resistant schizophrenia and the development of an adverse event monitoring system, clozapine re-emerged as a viable antipsychotic. According to Barker (2003), the three most-accepted atypical drugs are clozapine, risperidone, and olanzapine. However, he goes on to explain that clozapine is usually the last resort when other drugs fail. Clozapine can cause agranulocytosis (a decreased number of white blood cells), requiring blood monitoring for the patient. Despite the effectiveness of clozapine for treatment-resistant schizophrenia, agents with a more favorable side-effect profile were sought for widespread use. During the 1990s, olanzapine, risperidone, and quetiapine were introduced, with ziprasidone and aripiprazole following in the early 2000s. The atypical antipsychotic paliperidone was approved by the FDA in late 2006.

The atypical antipsychotics have found favor among clinicians and are now considered to be first-line treatments for schizophrenia and are gradually replacing the typical antipsychotics. In the past, most researchers have agreed that the defining characteristics of atypical antipsychotics are the decreased incidence of extrapyramidal side effects (EPS) and an absence of sustained prolactin elevation.

The terminology can still be imprecise. The definition of "atypicality" was based upon the absence of extrapyramidal side effects, but there is now a clear understanding that atypical antipsychotics can still induce these effects (though to a lesser degree than typical antipsychotics). Recent literature focuses more upon specific pharmacological actions and less upon categorization of an agent as "typical" or "atypical". There is no clear dividing line between the typical and atypical antipsychotics therefore categorization based on the action is difficult.

More recent research is questioning the notion that second-generation antipsychotics are superior to first generation typical antipsychotics. Using a number of parameters to assess quality of life, Manchester University researchers found that typical antipsychotics were no worse than atypical antipsychotics. The research was funded by the National Health Service (NHS) of the UK. Because each medication (whether first or second generation) has its own profile of desirable and adverse effects, a neuropsychopharmacologist may recommend one of the older ("typical" or first generation) or newer ("atypical" or second generation) antipsychotics alone or in combination with other medications, based on the symptom profile, response pattern, and adverse effects history of the individual patient.

Society and culture
Between May 2007 and April 2008, 5.5 million Americans filled at least one prescription for an atypical antipsychotic. In patients under the age of 65, 71% of patients were prescribed an atypical antipsychotic to treat Schizophrenia or Bipolar Disorder where this dropped to 38% in patients aged 65 or above.

Regulatory status

Notes

Stahl: AP Explained 1

References

Further reading 

 
 
 New antipsychotic drugs carry risks for children (USA Today 2006)

External link

Psychopharmacology
Treatment of psychosis